Multia is a municipality of Finland. It is located in the Central Finland region.

The municipality is unilingually Finnish. The municipality has previously also been known as "Muldia" in Swedish documents, but is today referred to as "Multia" also in Swedish.

Geography
Neighbouring municipalities are Keuruu, Petäjävesi, Saarijärvi, Uurainen and Ähtäri.

There are all together 146 lakes in Multia. Biggest lakes in Multia are Sinervä, Tarhapäänjärvi and Sahrajärvi-Pienvesi.

During the summer months (June - August) Multia is the rainiest municipality in Finland, with an average of 237.3 millimeters (9.3 inches) of rainfall.

Events
Kicksled World Championship

Notable people
 Seth Heikkilä (1863–1938)
 Tauno Sipilä (1921–2001)
 Pentti Papinaho (1926-1992)
 Erkki Pohjanheimo (born 1942)

References

External links

Municipality of Multia – Official website 

Multia
Populated places established in 1868